Palum Pazhamum is a 1961 Indian Tamil-language film directed by A. Bhimsingh. The film stars Sivaji Ganesan and B. Saroja Devi. It was released on 9 September 1961. The film was remade in Kannada as Beratha Jeeva, and in Hindi as Saathi.

Plot 
Ravi is a doctor searching for a cancer cure. Shanthi is Ravi's nurse who assists him in his research. Ravi offers to marry her after her father's death. After putting in enormous efforts, Ravi emerges successful in formulating a new drug but Shanthi is diagnosed with tuberculosis. Ravi begins to neglect his duties as a doctor, focusing on Shanthi's health. Shanthi flees on a train as she does not wish to divert him from his research.

The train crashes and Shanthi is believed to be dead. Ravi is heartbroken but vows to complete his research. Ravi's family forces him to marry Nalini, but they do not have a happy home life, as he is more oriented towards his research than his family. Nalini and Ravi fight, and in one of these fights Ravi loses his eyesight. Meanwhile, Shanthi escapes the train crash and goes to Switzerland to cure her tuberculosis. Shanthi returns from Switzerland to find that her husband has lost his eyesight. She offers to nurse Ravi; Ravi finds her voice familiar but does not recognise her, and confides in her that he is still fond of his ex-wife. Nalini overhears this, and complains to her parents. Shanthi faces criticism from the womenfolk of the house for her intimacy with Ravi.

Ravi's brother Sekar grows fond of Shanthi and tells Ravi so. Ravi suggests they marry. Shanthi is upset and reveals her identity to Ravi's family. Ravi's sight is restored by an operation. He recognises Shanti and rushes to the marriage hall to find that Shanthi's sister is married to his brother. Ravi reunites with Shanti while Nalini joins the Red Cross and flies to Switzerland. The movie ends with Ravi and Shanthi working together to benefit mankind.

Cast 
Sivaji Ganesan as Dr. Ravi
B. Saroja Devi as Shanthi & Neela
Sowcar Janaki as Nalini
M. R. Radha as Mama
T. S. Balaiah as Chinnavar
S. V. Subbaiah as Periyavar
M. S. Sundari Bai as Gomathi
A. Karunanidhi as Sanjeevi
Manorama as Mayilvahanam
C. T. Rajakantham as Maruthayee
K. Sairam as Devangu
S. A. Kannan as Shanthi Ungel
T. Thangaraj
V. Nagayya as Doctor (Guest Appearance)
Prem Nazir as Sekar
K. D. Santhanam as Bai

Production 
The song "Thendral Varum" which was picturised on Sowcar Janaki was removed from the film due to length issues.

Soundtrack 
The music was composed by Viswanathan–Ramamoorthy (a duo consisting of M. S. Viswanathan and T. K. Ramamoorthy) with lyrics by Kannadasan. The song "Ennai Yaarendru" is based on Sindhu Bhairavi raga, "Indha Nadagam" is based on Shubhapantuvarali, "Kadhal Siragai" is based on Kapi, and "Paalum Pazhamum" is based on Natabhairavi. The song "Naan Pesa Ninaippathellam" was written by Kannadasan to showcase his friendship with Viswanathan.

Release and reception 
Palum Pazhamum was released on 9 September 1961, and distributed by Sivaji Films. Kumudam praised the film for Saroja Devi's performance. Kanthan of Kalki criticised the film title's lack of relevance to the story, but called the film an entertainer. The film ran for over 100 days in theatres.

In popular culture 
The film's title also became the name for a collection of silk saris.

References

External links 
 

1960s Tamil-language films
1961 films
Films directed by A. Bhimsingh
Films scored by Viswanathan–Ramamoorthy
Tamil films remade in other languages